John MacLaughlin  was an Irish Anglican priest.

MacLaughlin was born in County Londonderry and educated at Trinity College, Dublin. He held livings at Killukin and Creeve. 
MacLaughlin  was  Archdeacon of Elphin in 1761 until 1769.  He was then Prebendary of Tirbrien in Elphin Cathedral from 1769 until 1777.

References 

Archdeacons of Elphin
Alumni of Trinity College Dublin
People from County Londonderry
18th-century Irish Anglican priests